Valley, originally known as , is a valley in the Diablo Range in San Benito County, California. The valley is drained by Quién Sabe Creek, ultimately a tributary to the Pajaro River to the northwest.

History 
Quien Sabe Valley is the location of the Rancho Santa Ana y Quién Sabe.

References 

Valleys of San Benito County, California
Diablo Range
La Vereda del Monte